Alexis Aubichon (born in 1787 in Alsace-Lorraine, France) was a soldier and trapper.

Life 
He spent his younger years traveling and exploring the wilderness. He became head of Hudson's Bay Company, to foster exploration and settlement in the west. His work impacted Oregon's development years after his time. During the conscription of Napoleon’s army in 1791, his family left the country and settled in Canada.

Twenty years later in 1811, he joined the settlement of the Red River of the North. It was during this time he met a Native American woman. The couple had one son together, his wife passing shortly after.

American citizenship 
It is said that Aubichon and his brother were drafted to the British Army, but then rejected because of their French descent. They left and joined the American army during the war in Britain. After being honourably discharged, they received their American Citizenship. However, the documents that support this information were destroyed. Later, this information was confirmed by Aubichon’s granddaughter, Catherine Petit Colbert. She wrote a letter giving her testament that throughout the years she lived with her grandfather, he repeated events in his life, including how he obtained American Citizenship.

In 1823, he married Comcomly's daughter Elvamox, also called MaryAnne, but their marriage was not recognized legally by the church until 1839 when a priest officiated it. At the time they had five children together: Alexis, Sophie, Emilie, Julie, and Catherine, ranging from ages 3-17, Alexis being the oldest. In the years to follow, they had three more children, Isabel, Lulu, and Philomen.

Legacy 
In 1840, he constructed "Obeshaw Landing". Later, this made an impact in Oregon's development. Eventually, "Obeshaw Landing" became known as "Butte Landing". This was his last known work before retiring in 1841. He retired in Buteville, Marion County. He participated in the Champoeg Meetings (1841–43) and supported adopting French as the language of government.

References 

1787 births
People from Alsace-Lorraine
French emigrants to Canada
Hudson's Bay Company people
French explorers of North America
People from Marion County, Oregon
Year of death missing